The Charter of the United Nations (UN) is the foundational treaty of the United Nations, an intergovernmental organization. It establishes the purposes, governing structure, and overall framework of the UN system, including its six principal organs: the Secretariat, the General Assembly, the Security Council, the Economic and Social Council, the International Court of Justice, and the Trusteeship Council.

The UN Charter mandates the UN and its member states to maintain international peace and security, uphold international law, achieve "higher standards of living" for their citizens, address "economic, social, health, and related problems", and promote "universal respect for, and observance of, human rights and fundamental freedoms for all without distinction as to race, sex, language, or religion". As a charter and constituent treaty, its rules and obligations are binding on all members and supersede those of other treaties.

During the Second World War, the Allies—formally known as the United Nations—agreed to establish a new postwar international organization. Pursuant to this goal, the UN Charter was discussed, prepared, and drafted during the San Francisco Conference that began 25 April 1945, which involved most of the world's sovereign nations. Following two-thirds approval of each part, the final text was unanimously adopted by delegates and opened for signature on 26 June 1945; it was signed in San Francisco, United States, by 50 of the 51 original member countries.

The Charter entered into force on 24 October 1945, following ratification by the five permanent members of the United Nations Security Council—China, France, the Soviet Union, the United Kingdom, and the United States—and a majority of the other signatories; this is considered the official starting date of the United Nations, with the first session of the General Assembly, representing all 51 initial members, opening in London the following January. The General Assembly formally recognized 24 October as United Nations Day in 1947, and declared it an official international holiday in 1971. With 193 parties, most countries have now ratified the Charter.

Summary

The Charter consists of a preamble and 111 articles grouped into 19 chapters.

The preamble consists of two principal parts. The first part contains a general call for the maintenance of peace and international security and respect for human rights. The second part of the preamble is a declaration in a contractual style that the governments of the peoples of the United Nations have agreed to the Charter and it is the first international document regarding human rights.
 Chapter I sets forth the purposes of the United Nations, including the important provisions of the maintenance of international peace and security.
 Chapter II defines the criteria for membership in the United Nations.
 Chapters III–XV, the bulk of the document, describe the organs and institutions of the UN and their respective powers.
 Chapters XVI and Chapter XVII describe arrangements for integrating the UN with established international law.
 Chapters XVIII and Chapter XIX provide for amendment and ratification of the Charter.

The following chapters deal with the enforcement powers of UN bodies:
 Chapter VI describes the Security Council's power to investigate and mediate disputes;
 Chapter VII describes the Security Council's power to authorize economic, diplomatic, and military sanctions, as well as the use of military force, to resolve disputes;
 Chapter VIII makes it possible for regional arrangements to maintain peace and security within their own region;
 Chapters IX and Chapter X describe the UN's powers for economic and social cooperation, and the Economic and Social Council that oversee these powers;
 Chapters XII and Chapter XIII describe the Trusteeship Council, which oversaw decolonization;
 Chapters XIV and Chapter XV establish the powers of, respectively, the International Court of Justice and the United Nations Secretariat.
 Chapters XVI through Chapter XIX deal respectively with XVI: miscellaneous provisions, XVII: transitional security arrangements related to World War II, XVIII: the charter amendment process, and XIX: ratification of the charter

History

Background 
The principles and conceptual framework of the United Nations were formulated incrementally through a series of conferences by the Allied nations during the Second World War. The Declaration of St James's Palace, issued in London on 12 June 1941, was the first joint statement of the goals and principles of the Allies, and the first to express a vision for a postwar world order. The Declaration called for the "willing cooperation of free peoples" so that "all may enjoy economic and social security".

Roughly two months later, the United States and the United Kingdom issued a joint statement elaborating these goals, known as the Atlantic Charter. It called for no territorial changes made against the wishes of the people, the right to self-determination for all peoples, restoration of self-government to those deprived of it, reduction of trade barriers, global cooperation to secure better economic and social conditions for the world, freedom from fear and want, freedom of the seas, and abandonment of the use of force, including mutual disarmament after the war. Many of these principles would inspire or form part of the UN Charter.

The following year, on 1 January 1942, representatives of thirty nations formally at war with the Axis powers—led by the "Big Four" powers of China, the Soviet Union, the U.K., and the U.S.—signed the Declaration by United Nations, which formalized the anti-Axis alliance and reaffirmed the purposes and principles of the Atlantic Charter. The following day, representatives of twenty-two other nations added their signatures. The term "United Nations" became synonymous with the Allies for the duration of the war, and was considered the formal name under which they were fighting. The Declaration by United Nations formed the basis of the United Nations Charter; virtually all nations that acceded to it would be invited to take part in the 1945 San Francisco Conference to discuss and prepare the Charter.

On 30 October 1943, the Declaration of the Four Nations, one of the four Moscow Declarations, was signed by the foreign ministers of the Big Four, calling for the establishment of a "general international organization, based on the principle of the sovereign equality of all peace-loving states, and open to membership by all such states, large and small, for the maintenance of international peace and security." This was the first formal announcement that a new international organization was being contemplated to replace the moribund League of Nations.

Pursuant to the Moscow Declarations, from 21 August 1944 to 7 October 1944, the U.S. hosted the Dumbarton Oaks Conference to develop a blueprint for what would become the United Nations. Many of the rules, principles, and provisions of the UN Charter were proposed during the conference, including the structure of the UN system; the creation of a "Security Council" to prevent future war and conflict; and the establishment of other "organs" of the organization, such as the General Assembly, International Court of Justice, and Secretariat. The conference was led by the Big Four, with delegates from other nation participating in the consideration and formulation of these principles. At the Paris peace conference in 1919, it was Prime Minister Jan Smuts of South Africa and Lord Cecil of the United Kingdom who came up with the structure of the League of Nations with the League being divided into a League Assembly consisting of all the member states and a League Council consisting of the great powers. The same design that Smuts and Cecil had devised for the League of Nations was copied for the United Nations with a Security Council made up of the great powers and a General Assembly of the UN member states.

The subsequent Yalta Conference in February 1945 between the U.S., U.K., and Soviet Union resolved the lingering debate regarding the voting structure of the proposed Security Council, calling for a "Conference of United Nations" in San Francisco on 25 April 1945 to "prepare the charter of such an organization, along the lines proposed in the formal conversations of Dumbarton Oaks."

Drafting and adoption 

The San Francisco Conference, formally the United Nations Conference on International Organization (UNCIO), began as scheduled on 25 April 1945 with the goal of drafting a charter that would create a new international organization. The Big Four, which sponsored the event, invited all forty-six signatories to the Declaration by United Nations. Conference delegates invited four more nations: Belorussian Soviet Socialist Republic, the Ukrainian Soviet Socialist Republic, recently liberated Denmark and Argentina.

The conference was perhaps the largest international gathering up to that point, with 850 delegates, along with advisers and organizers, for a total of 3,500 participants. An additional 2,500 representatives from media and various civil society groups were also in attendance. Plenary meetings involving all delegates were chaired on a rotational basis by the lead delegates of the Big Four. Several committees were formed to facilitate and address different aspects of the drafting process, with over 400 meetings convened in the subsequent weeks. Following multiple reviews, debates, and revisions, a final full meeting was held on 25 June 1945 with the final proposed draft posed to attendees. Following unanimous approval, the Charter was signed by delegates the following day in Veterans' Memorial Hall.

Provisions

Preamble

The Preamble to the treaty reads as follows:

Although the Preamble is an integral part of the Charter, it does not set out any of the rights or obligations of member states; its purpose is to serve as an interpretative guide for the provisions of the Charter through the highlighting of some of the core motives of the founders of the organization.

Chapter I: Purposes and Principles

Article 1
The Purposes of the United Nations are
 To maintain international peace and security, to take effective collective measures for the prevention and removal of threats to the peace, and for the suppression of acts of aggression or other breaches of the peace, and to bring about by peaceful means, and in conformity with the principles of justice and international law, adjustment or settlement of international disputes or situations which might lead to a breach of the peace;
 To develop friendly relations among nations based on respect for the principle of equal rights and self-determination of peoples, and to take other appropriate measures to strengthen universal peace;
 To achieve international co-operation in solving international problems of an economic, social, cultural, or humanitarian character, and in promoting and encouraging respect for human rights and for fundamental freedoms for all without distinction as to race, sex, language, or religion; and
 To be a centre for harmonizing the actions of nations in the attainment of these common ends.

Article 2
The Organization and its Members, in pursuit of the Purposes stated in Article 1, shall act in accordance with the following Principles:

 The Organization is based on the principle of the sovereign equality of all its Members.
 All Members, in order to ensure, to all of them the rights and benefits resulting from membership, shall fulfill in good faith the obligations assumed by them in accordance with the present Charter.
 All Members shall settle their international disputes by peaceful means in such a manner that international peace and security, and justice, are not endangered.
 All Members shall refrain in their international relations from the threat or use of force against the territorial integrity or political independence of any state, or in any other manner inconsistent with the Purposes of the United Nations.
 All Members shall give the United Nations every assistance in any action it takes in accordance with the present Charter and shall refrain from giving assistance to any state against which the United Nations is taking preventive or enforcement action.
 The Organization shall ensure that states which are not Members of the United Nations act in accordance with these Principles so far as may be necessary for the maintenance of international peace and security.
 Nothing contained in the present Charter shall authorize the United Nations to intervene in matters which are essentially within the domestic jurisdiction of any state or shall require the Members to submit such matters to settlement under the present Charter; but this principle shall not prejudice the application of enforcement measures under Chapter VII of the United Nations Charter.

Chapter II: Membership

Chapter II of the United Nations Charter deals with membership of the United Nations organization

Chapter III: Organs

 There are established as principal organs of the United Nations: a General Assembly, a Security Council, an Economic and Social Council, a Trusteeship Council, an International Court of Justice, and a Secretariat.
 Such subsidiary organs as may be found necessary may be established in accordance with the present Charter.

Chapter IV: The General Assembly

Chapter V: The Security Council

Chapter VI: Peaceful Settlement of Disputes

Chapter VII: Action with respect to Threats to the Peace, Breaches of the Peace, and Acts of Aggression

Chapter VIII: Regional Arrangements

Chapter IX: International Economic and Social Co-operation

Chapter X: The Economic and Social Council

Chapter XI: Declaration regarding Non-Self-Governing Territories

Chapter XII: International Trusteeship System

Chapter XIII: The Trusteeship Council

Chapter XIV: The International Court of Justice

Chapter XV: The Secretariat
 It comprises the Secretary-General and such other staff as the organization may require.
 It provides services to the other organs of the United Nations, such as the General Assembly, the S.C., the ECOSOC, and the trusteeship council, as well as their subsidiary bodies.
 The Secretary-General is appointed by the General Assembly on the recommendation of security council.
 The staff of the secretariat is appointed by the Secretary-General according to the regulations laid down by the General Assembly.
 The secretariat is located at the headquarters of the U.N in New York.
 The secretariat also includes the regional commission secretariat at Baghdad, Bangkok, Geneva and Santiago.

Functions of the Secretariat
 preparation of report and other documents containing information, analysis, historical background research finding, policy suggestions and so forth, to facilitate deliberations and decision making by other organs.
 to facilitate legislative organs and their subsidiary bodies.
 provision of meeting services for the General Assembly and other organs
 provision of editorial, translation and document reproduction services for the issuance of UN documents in different language.
 conduct of studies and provision of information to various member states in meeting challenge in various fields
 preparation of statistical publication, information bulletin and analytical work which the General Assembly has decided
 organization of conferences experts group meetings and seminar on topics of concern to the international community
 provision of technical assistance to develop countries.
 understanding of service mission to countries, areas or location as authorized by the General Assembly or the security

Chapter XVI: Miscellaneous Provisions

Chapter XVII: Transitional Security Arrangements

Chapter XVIII: Amendments
The General Assembly has the power to amend the UN Charter. Amendments adopted by a vote of two-thirds of the members of the Assembly need to be ratified by two-thirds of the Member-States, including all the Permanent Members of the Security Council.

Chapter XIX: Ratification and Signature

Provided that the Charter would enter into force once ratified by the Permanent Five members of the United Nations Security Council and a majority of the other signatory states, and set forth related procedures, such as providing certified copies to ratifying governments.

See also 

 Command responsibility
 History of United Nations peacekeeping
 Nuremberg Principles
 Universal Declaration of Human Rights

Footnotes

References

Books and articles

External links 

 Full Text In the UN Website
 Scanned copy of the signed charter
 Original ratifications .
 Ratifications/admissions under Article IV .
 Alger Hiss recounts transporting the UN Charter after its signing.
 Procedural history note and audiovisual material on the Charter of the United Nations in the Historic Archives of the United Nations Audiovisual Library of International Law
 Declaration of Principles of International Law Concerning Friendly Relations and Cooperation Among States in Accordance with the Charter of the United Nations
 Lecture by Annebeth Rosenboom entitled Practical Aspects of Treaty Law: Treaty Registration under Article 102 of the Charter of the United Nations in the Lecture Series of the United Nations Audiovisual Library of International Law
 

 
1945 in the United Nations
June 1945 events
October 1945 events
United Nations Charter
United Nations Charter
United Nations Charter
United Nations Charter
United Nations Charter
Treaties of the Kingdom of Afghanistan
Treaties of the People's Socialist Republic of Albania
Treaties of Algeria
Treaties of Andorra
Treaties of the People's Republic of Angola
Treaties of Antigua and Barbuda
Treaties of Argentina
Treaties of Armenia
Treaties of Australia
Treaties of Austria
Treaties of Azerbaijan
Treaties of the Bahamas
Treaties of Bahrain
Treaties of Bangladesh
Treaties of Barbados
Treaties of the Byelorussian Soviet Socialist Republic
Treaties of Belgium
Treaties of Belize
Treaties of the Republic of Dahomey
Treaties of Bhutan
Treaties of Bolivia
Treaties of Bosnia and Herzegovina
Treaties of Botswana
Treaties of Vargas-era Brazil
Treaties of Brunei
Treaties of the People's Republic of Bulgaria
Treaties of Burkina Faso
Treaties of Myanmar
Treaties of Burundi
Treaties of the Kingdom of Cambodia (1953–1970)
Treaties of Cameroon
Treaties of Canada
Treaties of Cape Verde
Treaties of the Central African Republic
Treaties of Chad
Treaties of Chile
Treaties of the Republic of China (1912–1949)
Treaties of Colombia
Treaties of the Comoros
Treaties of the Republic of the Congo (Léopoldville)
Treaties of the Republic of the Congo
Treaties of Costa Rica
Treaties of Ivory Coast
Treaties of Croatia
Treaties of Cuba
Treaties of Cyprus
Treaties of the Czech Republic
Treaties of Czechoslovakia
Treaties of Denmark
Treaties of Djibouti
Treaties of Dominica
Treaties of the Dominican Republic
Treaties of East Timor
Treaties of Ecuador
Treaties of the Kingdom of Egypt
Treaties of El Salvador
Treaties of Equatorial Guinea
Treaties of Eritrea
Treaties of Estonia
Treaties of the Ethiopian Empire
Treaties of Fiji
Treaties of Finland
Treaties of the French Fourth Republic
Treaties of Gabon
Treaties of the Gambia
Treaties of Georgia (country)
Treaties of West Germany
Treaties of East Germany
Treaties of Ghana
Treaties of the Kingdom of Greece
Treaties of Grenada
Treaties of Guatemala
Treaties of Guinea
Treaties of Guinea-Bissau
Treaties of Haiti
Treaties of Honduras
Treaties of the Hungarian People's Republic
Treaties of Iceland
Treaties of British India
Treaties of Indonesia
Treaties of Pahlavi Iran
Treaties of the Kingdom of Iraq
Treaties of Ireland
Treaties of Israel
Treaties of Italy
Treaties of Jamaica
Treaties of Japan
Treaties of Jordan
Treaties of Kazakhstan
Treaties of Kenya
Treaties of Kiribati
Treaties of North Korea
Treaties of South Korea
Treaties of Kuwait
Treaties of Kyrgyzstan
Treaties of the Kingdom of Laos
Treaties of Latvia
Treaties of Lebanon
Treaties of Lesotho
Treaties of Liberia
Treaties of the Kingdom of Libya
Treaties of Liechtenstein
Treaties of Lithuania
Treaties of Luxembourg
Treaties of North Macedonia
Treaties of Madagascar
Treaties of Malawi
Treaties of the Federation of Malaya
Treaties of the Maldives
Treaties of Mali
Treaties of Malta
Treaties of the Marshall Islands
Treaties of Mauritania
Treaties of Mauritius
Treaties of Mexico
Treaties of the Federated States of Micronesia
Treaties of Moldova
Treaties of Monaco
Treaties of the Mongolian People's Republic
Treaties of Montenegro
Treaties of Morocco
Treaties of the People's Republic of Mozambique
Treaties of Namibia
Treaties of Nauru
Treaties of Nepal
Treaties of the Netherlands
Treaties of New Zealand
Treaties of Nicaragua
Treaties of Niger
Treaties of Nigeria
Treaties of Norway
Treaties of Oman
Treaties of the Dominion of Pakistan
Treaties of Palau
Treaties of Panama
Treaties of Papua New Guinea
Treaties of Paraguay
Treaties of Peru
Treaties of the Commonwealth of the Philippines
Treaties of the Polish People's Republic
Treaties of the Estado Novo (Portugal)
Treaties of Qatar
Treaties of the Socialist Republic of Romania
Treaties of Rwanda
Treaties of Saint Kitts and Nevis
Treaties of Saint Lucia
Treaties of Saint Vincent and the Grenadines
Treaties of Samoa
Treaties of San Marino
Treaties of São Tomé and Príncipe
Treaties of Saudi Arabia
Treaties of Senegal
Treaties of Serbia and Montenegro
Treaties of Seychelles
Treaties of Sierra Leone
Treaties of Singapore
Treaties of Slovakia
Treaties of Slovenia
Treaties of the Solomon Islands
Treaties of the Somali Republic
Treaties of the Union of South Africa
Treaties of South Sudan
Treaties of the Soviet Union
Treaties of Francoist Spain
Treaties of the Dominion of Ceylon
Treaties of the Republic of the Sudan (1956–1969)
Treaties of Suriname
Treaties of Eswatini
Treaties of Sweden
Treaties of Switzerland
Treaties of the Syrian Republic (1930–1963)
Treaties of Tajikistan
Treaties of Tanganyika
Treaties of Thailand
Treaties of Togo
Treaties of Tonga
Treaties of Trinidad and Tobago
Treaties of Tunisia
Treaties of Turkey
Treaties of Turkmenistan
Treaties of Tuvalu
Treaties of Uganda
Treaties of the Ukrainian Soviet Socialist Republic
Treaties of the United Arab Emirates
Treaties of the United Kingdom
Treaties of the United States
Treaties of Uruguay
Treaties of Uzbekistan
Treaties of Vanuatu
Treaties of Venezuela
Treaties of Vietnam
Treaties of South Yemen
Treaties of the Mutawakkilite Kingdom of Yemen
Treaties of Yugoslavia
Treaties of Zambia
Treaties of the Sultanate of Zanzibar
Treaties of Zimbabwe
United Nations treaties
United Nations Charter
United Nations Charter
Treaties extended to Curaçao and Dependencies
Treaties extended to Portuguese Macau
Treaties extended to British Hong Kong
Treaties extended to Midway Atoll
Treaties extended to the Faroe Islands
Treaties extended to Greenland
Treaties extended to Tokelau
History of San Francisco